Carlos Andrés Villa Perdomo (born 18 July 1986) is a Guatemalan professional footballer who currently plays as striker for Romanian Liga 1 club CS Concordia Chiajna since 2012. He has also been a member of the Guatemalan national team.

Villa started his career at CSD Municipal, being the son of the club's former president, Ernesto Villa. In 2008 and 2009 he played at the University of Hartford in West Hartford, Connecticut. In September 2011 he was loaned from Municipal to Antigua GFC in Guatemala's Primera División de Ascenso. In February and March 2012, he was a part of a mid-season camp at Romanian Liga 1 club CS Concordia Chiajna.

In 2007 and 2008 he was a member of the Guatemala U-23 national team, playing at the 2008 Pre-Olympic tournament, where he scored one goal. His senior national team debut occurred on 11 November 2011 in a World Cup qualification match against Grenada.

References

External links
 
 

1986 births
Living people
Guatemalan footballers
Guatemala international footballers
C.S.D. Municipal players
Antigua GFC players
CS Concordia Chiajna players
Association football forwards